Moderate Socialists or simply Moderates Party, was a political party in Qajari Persia and one of the two major parties of the constitutional period alongside its parliamentary rival Social Democratic Party–Democrat Party. It was Iran's first right-wing political party.

Members 
The party membership consisted largely of landowners, constitutionalist ulema and bazaaris. It espoused the traditional middle-class and landed aristocracy. Notable members and supporters were:
 Sayyed Mohammad Tabatabai 
 Sayyed Abdullah Behbahani
 Ali-Mohammad Dawlatabadi
 Mohammad Vali Khan Tonekaboni
 Abdol-Hossein Farmanfarma
 Abolqasem Naser al-Molk
 Ali-Akbar Dehkhoda
 Mohammad Mossadegh

Views 
The party claimed to uphold the principles of Islam, proposing military, judicial, and economic reforms, as well as strengthening the constitutional monarchy, convening the Senate, protecting family values, private property, limitation of the work week and wages in accordance with work performed, and prohibition of child labor. 
It also expressed support for freedom of association and freedom of the press.

Parliament election results

References 

Political parties established in 1909
Political parties disestablished in 1918
Political parties in Qajar Iran
Conservative parties in Iran